FITC may refer to:

 Fluorescein isothiocyanate, a chemical compound
 Flash In the Can, a variation of the expression "flash in the pan" that indicates brevity - see Flash pan
 Fleet Intelligence Training Center - see Intelligence Specialist (United States Navy ratings)